Jacopo Dezi (born 10 February 1992) is an Italian professional footballer who plays as a central midfielder for Serie C club Padova.

Career

Napoli
Dezi was signed by Napoli 20 June 2011 in a co-ownership deal for €20,000. In June 2012 Napoli signed Dezi outright for another €90,000. On 18 July 2012, he was signed by Barletta on a temporary deal.

Crotone
In July 2013, Dezi left for Crotone on a temporary deal, with an option to purchase. On 18 June 2014, Crotone signed Dezi's 50% registration rights for €80,000. On 25 June 2015, Napoli bought back Dezi.

Return to Napoli
Dezi became a Napoli player again on 1 July 2015. On 28 January 2016, Dezi was signed on loan by Bari, along with his young Napoli teammate Gennaro Tutino, with an option to buy. On 10 August 2016, Dezi left Napoli again for Perugia.

On 25 July 2017, Dezi moved to Italian side Parma, on a loan deal with an obligation to buy.

On 26 July 2019, Dezi joined Serie B club Empoli on loan with an obligation to buy. On 31 January 2020, he moved to Virtus Entella on loan with a conditional obligation to buy.

On 1 February 2021, Dezi signed with Italian club Venezia.

On 31 January 2022, Dezi signed with Padova until 30 June 2024.

References

External links
 
 

Living people
1992 births
Sportspeople from the Province of Teramo
Footballers from Abruzzo
Association football midfielders
Italian footballers
Italy under-21 international footballers
Serie A players
Serie B players
Serie C players
S.S.C. Napoli players
F.C. Crotone players
S.S.C. Bari players
A.C. Perugia Calcio players
Parma Calcio 1913 players
Empoli F.C. players
Virtus Entella players
Venezia F.C. players
Calcio Padova players
Universiade gold medalists for Italy
Universiade medalists in football